Acacia koaia, known as koaia or koaie in Hawaiian, is a species of acacia that is endemic to Hawaii.  It is closely related to koa (Acacia koa), and is sometimes considered to be the same species.

Description
Acacia koaia is usually distinguished by growing as a short (rarely more than ), broad, gnarled tree; having the seeds longitudinally arranged in the pod; shorter, straighter phyllodes; and much denser wood.  A population on the northern coast of Kauai may be intermediate, but the relationships have not been worked out.  Koaia wood is claimed to be very different from that of koa, and this may be the best character to separate them.

Distribution
Acacia koaia, Koaia, is highly adapted to dry habitats, and is capable of forming dense forests in areas with very little rainfall.  It was formerly found widely in dry forests on all of the main islands.  Associated plants include uluhe (Dicranopteris linearis), hala (Pandanus tectorius), 	kookoolau (Bidens spp.), kokio (Hibiscus kokio), nehe (Lipochaeta spp.), hala pepe (Dracaena spp.), and ōhia lehua (Metrosideros polymorpha).

Like many legumes, koaia is able to fix nitrogen.  However, it has been devastated by cattle and other ungulates and is now rare.  It can be seen on ranch land in North Kohala, and at a small fenced exclosure outside of Waimea known as the koaia sanctuary. Koaia is one of the species being used to revegetate the island of Kahoolawe, which lost most of its plant life to overgrazing and ordnance testing.

Uses

Medicinal
Native Hawaiians ground koaia leaves and bark with auaukoi (Senna occidentalis) and kikānia pipili (Desmodium sandwicense) stalks.  The mixture was then hydrated and used in a steam bath to treat diseased skin.

Non-medicinal
The wood of koaia is harder and more dense than that of koa. It was used to make laau melomelo (fishing lures), hoe (paddles), ihe (short spears), pololu (long spears), ōō (digging sticks), ie kūkū (square kapa beaters), and papa olonā (Touchardia latifolia scrapers). Koaia leaves  were used to cover hale lau koaie (shelters and permanent sheds).

Gallery

References

External links 
Photos of Acacia koaia at Hawaiian Ecosystems at Risk Project (HEAR)

koaia
Endemic flora of Hawaii
Trees of Hawaii
Plants described in 1888